During the 2021–22 season the men's team will play in Superettan. It is also the women's second consecutive season in Basketligan dam.

Players

Men

Squad information

Women

Squad information

Preseason

Men

Women

Regular season

Men

Superettan

Playoffs

Women

Basketligan dam

References 

Sport in Helsingborg
Basketligan seasons
2021–22 in European basketball by club